Surender Pal Singh is an Indian politician and member of the Bharatiya Janata Party from a well known village Chak 52GG Gulabewala dist Sri Ganganagar Rajasthan. Surender Pal is a member of the Rajasthan Legislative Assembly from the  Karanpur constituency in Rajasthan. He is minister of Labour and Employment, Factory and Boilers Inspection in Government of Rajasthan

References

Bharatiya Janata Party politicians from Rajasthan
Rajasthan MLAs 2013–2018
Living people
State cabinet ministers of Rajasthan
Year of birth missing (living people)